HRT 3 (HTV 3, "Treći program") is a Croatian free-to-air television channel from Hrvatska Radiotelevizija, that was launched on 13 September 2012.

History
HRT 3's original history began in 1989, when this channel was originally known as Z3 and later HTV Z3. It officially came on air on 1 March 1991, but was taken off air on 16 September 1991, when its main transmitter, the Sljeme TV tower, was damaged in an air raid. On 7 November 1994, the channel came back on air, this time as HRT 3. The channel was shut down on 28 March 2004, but this time with its frequency de-nationalized and out up for lease in a public tender (it has been used by RTL Televizija ever since).

The channel was later relaunched for the second time on 13 September 2012, but with a new emphasis on educational and documentary material, as well as showing classic films and series, with occasional art and independent films. The program is broadcast in MUX B on Croatian territory, via satellite Eutelsat 16A at frequency 10,721 GHz H 27,500th.

Programming

Series
 Sherlock
 Kojak
 Midsomer Murders
 Gunsmoke
 Little House on the Prairie
 The Simpsons

Documentaries
 Not loads beast
 Gorski Kotar-four seasons
 In your eyes

Sports
 UEFA Europa League
 UEFA Europa Conference League

Emissions
 Croatian academics
 The woman dragon
 Portreti
 Trikultura
 Special Music
 Time for Jazz
 Kulturna baština
 U dobrom društvu
 Summer archive
 File contents
 Third round
 Interview of the Week
 Third history
 Stand up 3
 Trikultura
 Book or life
 Good morning, cultures

References

External links
Official website 
HTV3 - TV and radio lexicon  (in Croatian)

Television channels in Croatia
Television channels in North Macedonia
Television channels and stations established in 1989
Croatian-language television stations